Urgleptes chamaeropsis is a species of beetle in the family Cerambycidae. It was described by Fisher in 1926.

References

Urgleptes
Beetles described in 1926